Nikola Bezmalinovic, known as Nick Bez was founder of fishing, canning, and shipping companies in Juneau, Alaska.  Nick Bez operated the largest fishing ship at the time the 423-foot, Pacific Explorer.  Nick Bez also owned and operated the Nornek cannery, two gold mines, Alaska Southern Packing Company, Peter Pan Seafoods, Alaska Southern Airways, Pacific Exploration Company and the Intercoastal Packing Company as well as West Coast Airlines which became part of Air West.  Nick Bez became known as a rags to riches entrepreneur. In 1919 Nikola Bezmalinovic changed his name to Nick Bez. Nick Bez died in 1969.

Nick Bez
Nick Bez (Nikola Bezmalinović) was born on the island of Selca, Brač in the Adriatic Sea, in Croatia in 1895. In 1910 at age 15 he came arrived in New York City on September 16, 1910, with his friend Louis G. Ursich.He worked in a restaurant and then by train moved to Tacoma, Washington. In Tacoma, he worked with a group of Dalmatian Italian fishermen. He then moved to Alaska and got a job on a towboat as a deckhand. He then purchased a rowboat, then a gas power boat. In 1914, he purchased a seiner fishing boat. The Alaskan cannery hired him as superintendent in 1922.  He when into business for himself again and purchased an abandoned cannery on Peril Strait, near Sitka, Alaska. The Peril Strait was very successful and profitable. With these profits, in 1934 he founded the Alaska Southern Airways. Bez started two more canneries in Alaska and operated two gold mines by 1936. In 1940, he founded the Alaska Southern Packing Company. Alaska Southern Packing Company ran a floating cannery called La Merced. He took over the Columbia River Packers Association in 1951 he sold the Association. In 1951 purchased P. E. Harris & Campany, a large salmon-packing and distributing company. P. E. Harris & Campany was founded in 1916. Bez and his wife live in the Mount Baker Mansion in Seattle. In 1940 he founded the Intercoastal Packing Company, which operated ship Orgontz a 390-foot steamship. The Orgontz was converted to a floating cannery.  Nick Bez died in 1969 of cancer.Croatian Leksikon AK, Naklada Leksikon doo, Zagreb, 1996, p. 93

Peter Pan Seafoods
After buying P. E. Harris & Company in 1951 Bez renamed the firm Peter Pan Seafoods. P. E. Harris & Company was founded in 1916.
P. E. Harris & Company packed salmon products: Peter Pan, Gill Netters Best, and Sea kist. Peter Pan Seafoods had canneries in Alaska, Puget Sound, and Astoria. In 1975 Bristol Bay Native Corporation purchased the firm. In 1979 it was old to Nichiro Gyogyo Kaisha Ltd. In 2007 this merged with Maruha Corporation. The Peter Pan Seafoods plant is in Dillingham, Alaska.coastview.org Peter Pan Seafoods

SS Pacific Explorer  
Bez purchased the ship 423-foot Pacific Explorer in 1946 from the United States and founded the Pacific Exploration Company.  The United States Defense Plant Corporation and sponsored by the War Food Administration gave a $2 million loan to the Pacific Exploration Company, part of the World War II Pacific Fishing project. The loan was to transform the 423-foot World War I ship Mormacrey into a modern fishing boat with a cannery on board. Naval architect with W.C. Nickum and Sons made the design work for the conversion of the ship. In doing so, it showed the United States could be a superpower in fishing, not just Japan, which had 66% of the tuna market. Pacific Explorer would operate in international waters off Alaska, with the four small 100-foot ships that supplied fish: NOAAS Oregon (R 551), Alaska, California, and Washington, called Pacific Coast Combination Ships. The Pacific Explorer first trip was from Astoria, Oregon to South America on January 3, 1947, for tuna. The Pacific Explorer floating cannery stayed off the Gulf of Nicoya, Costa Rica for five months, and 10 fishing ships provided 2,250 tons of tuna. Second trip of the Pacific Explorer was from Seattle started on March 26, 1948, to the Bering Sea. Nine fishing boat supplied the King crab, flatfish and cod for the Pacific Explorer the: Bear, Sunbeam, Borris, Tordenskjold, Kiska, Mars, Foremost, Jeanette F and Pearl Harbor. The Pacific Explorer was in Pavlof Bay as the "cannery" (frozen) for 90 days.Cole, James A, 2013, Drawing on Our History, Fishing Vessels of the Pacific Northwest and Alaska. Page 140, 148 and 149 <Carmelfinley.com> posting January 13, 2014, or Bobs posting No. 14 After the two fishing trip and proving the idea, the Pacific Explorer was put into a reserve fleet.Hanson, H. C. 1955 Pacific Combination Fishing Vessels. In Fishing Boats of the World, FAO, Fishing News London England, pp 187–202.

Alaska Southern Airways
In 1932 Bez purchased Alaska Southern Airways. Alaska Southern Airways had routes to Seattle, Juneau, Cordova, and Ketchikan. Alaska Southern Airways was the first airline to fly into Alaska. Alaska Southern Airways operated the first Douglas DC-3 planes in Alaska. Bez ran the airline so his workers could get to his fishing boats, cannery and ships more quickly. Alaska Southern Airways Lockheed 5B Vega, named Baranof crashed in Pinta Bay, Alaska on October 10, 1934, killing one person. Alaska Southern Airways was sold to Pan Am in 1934. 

West Coast Airlines and Air West

In 1946 Bez purchased West Coast Airlines which was based in Seattle. According to its system timetable, in 1968 West Coast Airlines was operating Douglas DC-9-10 jets, Fairchild F-27 turboprops and Douglas DC-3 prop aircraft as well as small Piper Navajo prop aircraft with scheduled passenger service to destinations in California, Idaho, Montana, Oregon, Utah and Washington state as well as to Calgary, Alberta in Canada.https://www.timetableimages.com/ttimages/wc/wc68/wc68-2.jpg  

In the late 1960s, West Coast Airlines merged with Bonanza Air Lines and Pacific Air Lines to form Air West.  Bez then sold Air West to Howard Hughes for 100 million dollars.  Following its sale, Air West was then renamed Hughes Airwest. Hughes Airwest was subsequently acquired and merged with Republic Airlines in 1980.

Historical marker

 A historical marker in Juneau, Alaska reads:
Between 1929 and 1932, passengers could fly between Juneau's waterfront and downtown Seattle on scheduled weekly flights of Alaska-Washington Consolidated Airways. The fare was $105. Juneau's harbor was home to three pioneer flying companies that offered commercial air service in the early 1930's. Alaska Southern Airways, Pacific Alaska Airways, and Panhandle Air Transport linked Juneau with outlying mines, canneries, lodges, and other communities in Southeast Alaska. Then came Alaska Air Transport and Marine Airways, which later merged to become Alaska Coastal Airlines. After Alaska Airlines purchased the local flying companies, the major carrier announced plans to discontinue regional floatplane service. Southeast Skyways was founded in 1968 to fill that gap. It handled both scheduled service and the growing seasonal interest in sightseeing flights. In the late 1970s, Southeast Skyways moved to the airport and Wings of Alaska took over the waterfront-based tourist trade. 

Nornek cannery
In 1918 the Northwestern Fisheries Company built a fish cannery, Nornek cannery, on the Naknek River. Nornek cannery was sold to the Pacific American Fisheries in 1935. In 1944 the Nornek cannery was sold to Intercoastal Packing Company and opened in 1947 and operated under the name Columbia River Packers Association.

Intercoastal Packing Company
Intercoastal Packing Company was founded in 1940. Intercoastal Packing Company operated the ship the SS Ogontz. Intercoastal Packing Company operated ships for the World War II effort.

Ships:
SS Western Clipper, Seiner built in 1939, wrecked off Atka in 1964
SS Toni B, former Navy tug USS ATR-50 built in 1943, sold to Bez in 1947, sank in February 1955, in heavy sea in Caribbean watersnavsource, USS ATR-50
SS Ogontz

SS Ogontz
Ogontz was built in 1919 by the American International Shipbuilding Corp., Hog Island, Pennsylvania, as the Scatacook, but renamed Ogontz for United States Shipping Board. In 1925 operated by Tampa Interocean Lines, then the Lykes Brothers Steamship Company in 1933. Sold to Nick Bez in 1938, then sold to Intercoastal Packing Company in 1940. On March 19, 1942, was torpedoed and sunk by German submarine U-103 off Cuba Coast. Was 5,753 ton cargo ship.
Intercoastal Packing Company ship Ogontz was used to help the World War II effort. During World War II Intercoastal Packing Company operated Merchant navy ships for the United States Shipping Board. During World War II Ogontz was in charter shipping with the Maritime Commission and War Shipping Administration. The ship was run by its Intercoastal Packing Company.World War II U.S. Navy Armed Guard and World War II U.S. Merchant Marine, 2007–2014 Project Liberty Ship, Project Liberty Ship, P.O. Box 25846 Highlandtown Station, Baltimore, MD 

Alaska Chichogof Mining CompanyAlaska Chichogof Mining Company' mine was started by Mike McKallich in 1928 in Klag Bay Sitka, Alaska. The gold mine was purchased by Bez in 1936 and worked one year. Alaska Chichogof mine is at an elevation of 98 feet. Silver ore is also found in the mine.

See also
World War II United States Merchant Navy
Alaska Packers' Association

References 

1895 births
1969 deaths
American airline chief executives
American financiers
American mining businesspeople
Yugoslav emigrants to the United States
Commercial fishing in Alaska